Paccha (from local Quechua Paqcha) is one of ten districts of the Yauli Province in Peru.

Geography 
Other mountains are listed below:

References